Symmerista is a genus of moths of the family Notodontidae erected by Jacob Hübner in 1821.

Species
Symmerista albifrons (Smith, 1797)
Symmerista aura Chacón, 2014
Symmerista canicosta Franclemont, 1946
Symmerista inbioi Chacón, 2014
Symmerista leucitys Franclemont, 1946
Symmerista luisdiegogomezi Chacón, 2014
Symmerista minaei Chacón, 2014
Symmerista suavis (Barnes, 1901)
Symmerista zacualpana (Draudt, 1932)

Former species
Symmerista tlotzin now Elymiotis tlotzin (Schaus, 1892)

References

Notodontidae